The St. Philips Episcopal Church in Harrodsburg, Kentucky is a historic church at Short and Chiles Streets.  It was built during 1860-1861 and was added to the National Register in 1978.

It is a brick church with granite trim.

References

Episcopal church buildings in Kentucky
Churches on the National Register of Historic Places in Kentucky
Gothic Revival church buildings in Kentucky
Churches completed in 1861
19th-century Episcopal church buildings
Churches in Mercer County, Kentucky
National Register of Historic Places in Mercer County, Kentucky
Harrodsburg, Kentucky
1861 establishments in Kentucky